Rachad Wildgoose II (born June 20, 2000) is an American football cornerback for the Washington Commanders of the National Football League (NFL). He played college football at Wisconsin and was drafted by the Buffalo Bills in the sixth round of the 2021 NFL Draft. Wildgoose has also been a member of the New York Jets.

Early life and college

Wildgoose was born on June 20, 2000, in Miami, Florida. He went to Northwestern High School. In April 2017, he committed to play college football for Rutgers; but de-committed in May 2017. He committed to Georgia the following month but de-committed in 2018 after choosing to attend the University of Wisconsin–Madison to play for the Wisconsin Badgers. 

Wildgoose played in 10 games with Wisconsin in 2018 and made 29 tackles. The next season he played in all 13 games and had 22 tackles. He also had an interception. His third season he played in only two games. He had a season ending injury against Northwestern which forced him to miss the rest of the season.

Professional career

Buffalo Bills
Wildgoose was selected in the sixth round (213th pick) of the 2021 NFL Draft by the Buffalo Bills. On May 13, 2021, Wildgoose signed his four-year rookie contract with Buffalo. He was waived on August 31, 2021, and re-signed to the practice squad the next day.

New York Jets
On November 16, 2021, Wildgoose was signed to the New York Jets active roster off the Bills practice squad. He played in five games in his rookie season and had three total tackles. He was released on August 30, 2022.

Washington Commanders
Wildgoose was claimed off waivers by the Washington Commanders on August 31, 2022. In the 2022 season, he appeared in 15 games, of which he started three. He had 16 total tackles and three passes defensed.

On February 28, 2023, Wildgoose signed a one-year contract extension with the Commanders.

References

External links
 
 Washington Commanders bio
 Wisconsin Badgers bio

2000 births
Living people
Players of American football from Miami
American football cornerbacks
Wisconsin Badgers football players
Buffalo Bills players
New York Jets players
Washington Commanders players